V. Stephen Moss (born February 3, 1950) is an American politician. He is a member of the South Carolina House of Representatives from the 30th District, serving since 2009. He is a member of the Republican Party.

References

Living people
1950 births
Republican Party members of the South Carolina House of Representatives
People from Cherokee County, South Carolina
21st-century American politicians